This list of notable bouncers includes celebrities and historical figures who worked as bouncers, often before they became famous in another profession or field.

Living people
 Pope Francis, current Pope who worked as a bouncer in a Buenos Aires bar before beginning seminary studies.
 Dave Bautista, American professional wrestler and actor, worked as a bouncer in Washington, D.C. nightclubs prior to his wrestling career.
 Vin Diesel, American actor who created his 'Vin Diesel' pseudonym to protect his anonymity while working as a bouncer.
 Vincent D'Onofrio, American actor on Law & Order: Criminal Intent and Netflix's Daredevil.
 Norman Foster, British architect and member of the House of Lords, worked as a nightclub bouncer whilst studying architecture at the University of Manchester.
 Carlton Leach, British former football hooligan and bodybuilder, the inspirational figure of the movie Rise of the Footsoldier.
 Dolph Lundgren, Swedish actor, director, and martial artist.
 Mr. T, American actor, former bouncer and twice winner of the "America's Toughest Bouncer" competition.
 Chazz Palminteri, American actor and writer.
 Glenn Ross, Northern Irish bouncer and strongman.
 Georges St-Pierre, Canadian mixed martial artist and UFC Welterweight Champion.
 Rob Terry, British professional wrestler.
 Geoff Thompson, British bouncer and author of the book Watch My Back.
 Justin Trudeau, the Prime Minister of Canada and leader of the Liberal Party, worked as a bouncer in Whistler Village, British Columbia, after his undergraduate studies.
Wyatt Lozano "America's Bouncer" Actor and competitive Powerlifter. Worked as a bouncer in Syracuse New York.
 is the bouncer at the Berghain nightclub in Berlin.

Historical figures and deceased people
 Al Capone, Chicago-based gangster, worked as a bartender/bouncer in his early life.
 Michael Clarke Duncan, American actor and former bouncer who also worked as a bodyguard for various celebrities.
 James Gandolfini, American actor who worked as a bouncer at an on-campus pub while studying at Rutgers University.
 Giant Haystacks (Martin Ruane), British professional wrestler.
 Lenny McLean, British bare-knuckle boxing heavyweight champion who also worked as a head doorman at London nightclubs.
 Rick Rude (Richard Rood), American professional wrestler.
 Road Warrior Animal (Joseph Laurinaitis), American professional wrestler.
 Patrick Swayze, American actor, and ballet dancer.
 Tony Vallelonga, American actor and occasional author, who worked as a bouncer when he was hired as a driver by pianist Don Shirley.

References

Security guards
+